Mario Andreacchio (born 1 January 1955) is an Australian film producer/director.

Born in Leigh Creek, South Australia to Italian parents, Andreacchio graduated from Flinders University with a degree in Psychology (after originally going to University to study Experimental Physics), and then was selected to study at the Australian Film and Television School to train as a film director. He has directed nine cinema feature films, made a series of television specials, two telemovies, three children's mini-series and a variety of documentaries. In 1988, he won an International Emmy Award in the 'Children and Young People' category for Captain Johnno, an episode of the 1988 Touch the Sun TV series.

In 2008 Andreacchio founded a film production company AMPCO FILMS PTY LTD (the Adelaide Motion Picture Company), based in Norwood, South Australia.

He has served on the boards of the Australian Film Finance Corporation and the South Australian Film Corporation.

Partial filmography
Fair Game (1986)
The Dreaming (1988)
Captain Johnno (1988)
Sky Trackers (1994)
Napoleon (1995)
The Real Macaw (1998)
Sally Marshall Is Not an Alien (1999)
Young Blades (2001)
Paradise Found (2003)
Elephant Tales (2005)
The Dragon Pearl (2011)

References

Sources
Adelaide Motion Picture Company website

External links

Australian film directors
Australian people of Italian descent
1955 births
Living people
Emmy Award winners
Australian Film Television and Radio School alumni